Arthur Virgilio do Carmo Ribeiro Neto (born November 15, 1945) better known as Arthur Virgilio or Arthur Neto, is a Brazilian politician and lawyer, career diplomat, member and one of the founders of the Brazilian Social Democracy Party. Since 2013, he serves as the mayor of his hometown Manaus, being re-elected for the office in 2016. Prior, Virgílio Neto already served as mayor of Manaus from 1989 to 1992. 

Virgilio Neto was elected twice to the Brazilian Chamber of Deputies between 1982 and 1986 and was a Senator for the State of Amazonas. He became one of the opposition leaders in the Brazilian senate of then-President Lula da Silva.

See also
 List of mayors of Manaus

References

External links
 

1945 births
Living people
People from Manaus
Mayors of Manaus
Brazilian Social Democracy Party politicians